Pucheng is an atonal pinyin romanization of various Chinese names and words.

Pucheng may refer to:

 Pucheng County (浦城县) in Fujian
 Pucheng County (蒲城县) in Shaanxi
 Pucheng Subdistrict (蒲城街道), formerly Pucheng Township (蒲城乡) and Putai County (蒲台縣), now an area of Binzhou, Shandong